Extreme is the first studio album by the American glam metal band Extreme, released in 1989 by A&M Records.  The album reached No. 80 on the Billboard 200, and produced the minor Mainstream Rock hit "Kid Ego". The single "Play with Me" is featured on the soundtrack for the comedy film Bill & Ted's Excellent Adventure, an opening episode of season 4 of Stranger Things, and the 2007 rhythm game, Guitar Hero Encore: Rocks the 80s.

Music
The album has been primarily described as glam metal, but has also been described as funk-metal, and hard rock.

Reception
The album sold modestly well at around 300,000 units, and was favored by heavy metal fans, but did not achieve significant mainstream success. Three of the album's singles, "Little Girls", "Kid Ego", and "Mutha (Don't Wanna Go to School Today)", received medium airplay on Headbangers Ball.

Extreme was met with mixed reception. AllMusic gave the album three stars saying,"Extreme's first album shows the band struggling to shed their influences, particularly Van Halen, and develop a style of their own; consequently, it's wildly uneven, but guitarist Nuno Bettencourt is always worth hearing". In his review for Extreme II: Pornograffitti, Bryan Rolli called the album "rote glam metal". Rolling Stone writer Kim Neely gave the album three stars, but called it an "extremely good listen".

Track listing
All songs written by Cherone & Bettencourt, except "Mutha (Don't Wanna Go to School Today)" by Cherone, LeBeaux & Hunt.

Personnel
 Pat Badger – bass guitar, backing vocals
 Nuno Bettencourt – guitar, synthesizer, piano, backing vocals, percussion, orchestration, mixing
 Gary Cherone – lead & backing vocals, design, logo design
 Paul Geary – drums, percussion, backing vocals, logo design

Additional musicians
 The Lollipop Kids – background vocals (tracks 5, 11)
 Rapheal May – harmonica (track 1)

Production
 Mack – producer on all but 2, 3 and 4 engineer, mixing
 Bob St. John – engineer, mixing
 Nigel Green – mixing on tracks 2, 3 and 4
 Howie Weinberg – masteringat Masterdisk, New York
 Jeff Gold – art direction
 Harris Savides – photography

Charts

Album

Singles

Accolades

References

1989 debut albums
Albums produced by Reinhold Mack
A&M Records albums
Extreme (band) albums
Funk metal albums
Hard rock albums by American artists